The Greece national football team have appeared in the  FIFA World Cup on three occasions, in 1994, 2010 and 2014. They were the reigning European champions when they failed to qualify for the 2006 tournament.

Overview

* Draws include knockout matches decided via penalty shoot-out.

1994 United States

Group stage

2010 South Africa

Round 1

2014 Brazil

Group stage

Knockout stage

Record players

Top goalscorers
Five players scored one goal each for Greece at a FIFA World Cup:

External links
Greece at FIFA.com

 
Countries at the FIFA World Cup
FIFA World Cup